The 1916 United States presidential election in Minnesota took place on November 7, 1916 as part of the 1916 United States presidential election. Minnesota voters chose 12 electors to the Electoral College, which selected the president and vice president.

Minnesota was won by the Republican candidate, former Associate Justice of the Supreme Court Charles Evans Hughes won the state over incumbent President Woodrow Wilson by a margin of just 392 votes, or 0.1011968% (one vote in 988). This is the fifteenth-closest statewide presidential election on record, and although it was only the second-closest result in 1916 after New Hampshire, there was not to be a closer result until Adlai Stevenson II won Kentucky in 1952 by 700 of 993,148 votes.

Wilson's performance was the closest any Democrat had come to carrying Republican stronghold Minnesota since Minnesota's statehood inception in 1858 – he was almost five percent ahead of his losing margin in 1912 when the state was won by Progressive Theodore Roosevelt. Wilson comfortably won the urban counties of Ramsey, Hennepin and St. Louis, which became rigid strongholds for the Democratic Party. Wilson also led Hughes in the socialist strongholds of the forestry- and mining-dominated northern counties. Nevertheless, Hughes won the state with dominance of the farming districts in the south and his ability to carry fifty-three of eighty-seven state counties.  Wilson was however the first Democrat to ever carry Lake, Kandiyohi, Saint Louis, Norman, Todd, Lyon, Murray and Martin Counties, the first to carry Carlton County since Winfield S. Hancock in 1880, and the first to win Hubbard County since Grover Cleveland in 1888.

Nationally, Wilson won the election, with 277 electoral votes and a tight 3.12% lead over Hughes in the popular vote. Wilson's re-election was the first instance in which a Democratic President was elected to a second consecutive term since Andrew Jackson’s 1832 re-election.

 this would be the last time that a Democrat would win the presidency without carrying Minnesota.

Minnesota held its first Presidential Primary on March 14, 1916.

Primary elections

Republican primary
The Republican primary took place on March 14, 1916. Albert B. Cummins, Henry D. Estabrook and William Grant Webster were the three candidates.

Democratic primary
The Democratic primary took place on March 14, 1916. Incumbent president, Woodrow Wilson, ran unopposed in the Democratic primary.

Prohibition primary
The Prohibition primary took place on March 14, 1916. William Sulzer, Eugene Foss were the two candidates, neither of which were members of the Prohibition party, although Sulzer had been nominated by the Prohibition party for Governor of New York in 1914.

Results

Results by county

See also
 United States presidential elections in Minnesota

References

1916
Minnesota
1916 Minnesota elections